Waltham is an MBTA Commuter Rail station in Waltham, Massachusetts. It serves the Fitchburg Line. It is located in downtown Waltham adjacent to Central Square (Waltham Common).

History and operations

The station has an unusual configuration, similar to Lincoln. There are 2 side platforms, separated by Moody Street: the eastern platform is used for inbound passengers, and the western platform is used for outbound passengers. Most of the station is located on a short single-track section; after double-tracking was completed from South Acton to Willows in 2014, this became the only single-track section of the Fitchburg Line. Elimination of the grade crossings at the station was considered the 1910s, but never constructed.

Commuter rail service to Waltham station has remained relatively constant since the MBTA was formed in 1964. However, several nearby stops on the Fitchburg Line and the Central Mass Branch were closed in the early years of the MBTA. The former depot building, which included a large clocktower, was demolished around 1962. The Waltham Interlocking Tower is located next to Elm Street; it controlled the junction with the Watertown Branch Railroad, which operated passenger service until July 9, 1938.

Accessible mini-high platforms were added in 2007.

Bus connections

Seven MBTA bus routes and one private route stop at Waltham station:
: North Waltham–Waltham Center
: Market Place Drive or Waltham Center–University Park
: Waltham Center–Federal Street & Franklin Street
: Roberts–Federal Street & Franklin Street
: Waverly Square–Federal Street & Franklin Street
: Waltham Highlands–Federal Street & Franklin Street
: Riverside Station–Federal Street & Franklin Street
128BC Waltham Shuttle, provides rush hour service to nearby businesses.

References

External links

MBTA – Waltham
Google Maps Street View: outbound platform, inbound platform

MBTA Commuter Rail stations in Middlesex County, Massachusetts
Railway stations in the United States opened in 1843